Marianne Bigum (born 10 April 1983) is a Danish politician and member of the Folketing, the national legislature. A member of the Green Left party, she has represented North Zealand since November 2022.

Bigum was born on 10 April 1983. She is daughter of butcher Tommy Bigum. She studied at Rungsted Skole (1995-1999) and Helsingør Gymnasium. She has a Bachelor of Science degree in chemistry (2007), a Master of Science degree in environmental engineering (2009) and a Doctor of Philosophy degree (2014) from the Technical University of Denmark. She was a consultant on Copenhagen Municipality's Plastic Zero project (2013-2014), technical specialist at the Environmental Protection Agency (Miljøstyrelsen) (2014-2018) and senior consultant at Ramboll (2018-2021). She was a team leader and expert on circular economy at the Asian Development Bank from 2020 to 2022. Se was a member of the municipal council in Rudersdal Municipality from 2009 to 2012.

Bigum's partner is Jacob Kragh Andersen and she has three children.

References

External links

1983 births
21st-century Danish women politicians
Danish municipal councillors
Living people
Members of the Folketing 2022–2026
Socialist People's Party (Denmark) politicians
Technical University of Denmark alumni
Women members of the Folketing